A list of windmills in the Dutch province of Overijssel.

 
Overijssel